Antonio Luigi Fuochi (25 April 1955 – 14 February 2022), better known as Tony Fuochi, was an Italian voice actor.

Biography
Active from the late 1980s until 2014, he voiced multiple characters from cartoons and video games including Mario.

Fuochi was hospitalized on 12 January with COVID-19 amid the COVID-19 pandemic in Italy. After more than a month spent in intensive care, he died in Padua on 14 February 2022, at the age of 66.

References

External links
Official website

 

 
1955 births
2022 deaths
Deaths from the COVID-19 pandemic in Veneto
Italian male voice actors
Male actors from Milan